Brachystomia carrozzai is a species of sea snail, a marine gastropod mollusk in the family Pyramidellidae, the pyrams and their allies.

Description
The size of the shell varies between 2.2 mm and 3.8 mm.

Distribution
This species occurs in the following locations:
 European waters (ERMS scope)
 Portuguese Exclusive Economic Zone
 Spanish Exclusive Economic Zone
 United Kingdom Exclusive Economic Zone
Mediterranean Sea

References

 Høisæter, T. (2014). The Pyramidellidae (Gastropoda, Heterobranchia) of Norway and adjacent waters. A taxonomic review. Fauna norvegica. 34: 7-78

External links
 
 To CLEMAM
 To Encyclopedia of Life
 To World Register of Marine Species

Pyramidellidae
Gastropods described in 1987